Robert John Yurgatis is an American stage and television actor. He is known for playing Jack Flood in the American crime drama television series Target: The Corruptors!.

Harland attended St. James High School for Boys, graduating in 1953. He then attended Columbia School of Broadcasting in Philadelphia, Pennsylvania before working as a disc jockey and radio announcer in Wilmington, Delaware. He then studied at the American Academy of Dramatic Arts in Manhattan, living in Greenwich Village, New York, while attending and taking roles in the academy's stage productions.

In 1957, Harland played the lead role in a production of Bus Stop at the Robin Hood Playhouse in Arden, Delaware. He adopted "Harland" as a stage name. Harland began his screen career in 1958, playing the lead role of Hank Moore in the film As Young as We Are. He played the role of Deputy Billy Lordan in the western television series Law of the Plainsman. In 1961, Harland starred in the new ABC crime drama television series Target: The Corruptors!, playing the role of Jack Flood. He starred alongside Stephen McNally, who played the role of Paul Marino.

After the series ended in 1962, Harland played the recurring role of Sgt. Older in the police procedural television series The Rookies, with also playing the recurring role of James Rayford in the television soap opera Dynasty. He has guest-starred in television programs including Outlaws, Petticoat Junction, Ben Casey, The Life and Legend of Wyatt Earp, Wagon Train, The Millionaire and Zane Grey Theatre.

References

External links 

Rotten Tomatoes profile

Living people
Place of birth missing (living people)
Year of birth missing (living people)
American male television actors
American male stage actors
Western (genre) television actors
American male soap opera actors
20th-century American male actors